Świątniki Górne is a town in southern Poland, situated in the Lesser Poland Voivodeship (since 1999), previously in Kraków Voivodeship (1975–1998).

External links
 Jewish Community in Świątniki Górne on Virtual Shtetl

Cities and towns in Lesser Poland Voivodeship
Kraków County
Kingdom of Galicia and Lodomeria
Kraków Voivodeship (1919–1939)